Böhmerwaldplatz is a Munich U-Bahn station on the U4 line, near Böhmerwaldplatz, in the borough of Bogenhausen.

See also
List of Munich U-Bahn stations

References

External links

Munich U-Bahn stations
Railway stations in Germany opened in 1988
1988 establishments in West Germany